Ban is the Mandarin pinyin romanization of the Chinese surname written  in Chinese character. It is romanized Pan in Wade–Giles. Ban is listed 235th in the Song dynasty classic text Hundred Family Surnames. It is not among the 300 most common surnames in China. In 2013 it was the 269th most common surname  shared by 273,000 people, comprising 0.021% of the total population and the provincial level unit with the most people having the name being Guangxi.

Origin
The surname Ban originated from Mi 芈, the royal surname of the State of Chu of ancient China. Dou Gouwutu (鬬穀於菟; fl. 7th century BC), a grandson of the Chu ruler Ruo'ao, was said to have been abandoned as an infant and nursed by a tigress. His given name Gouwutu, meant nursed (穀 gòu, milk) by a tiger (於菟 wūtú, tiger) in the Chu language. Dou Gouwutu grew up to become a general and the Prime Minister of Chu. His descendants adopted Ban (meaning "stripes", an allusion to tiger's stripes) as their surname.

Notable people
 Consort Ban (c. 48 BC – 6 BC), scholar, poet, and consort of Emperor Cheng of Han
 Ban Biao (3–54), Han dynasty historian, nephew of Consort Ban
 Ban Gu (32–92), historian and son of Ban Biao, main author of the Book of Han
 Ban Chao (32–102), general, explorer, and diplomat, son of Ban Biao
 Ban Zhao (45 – c. 116), the first female Chinese historian, daughter of Ban Biao
 Ban Yong (died c. 128), Eastern Han general and governor of the Western Regions, son of Ban Chao
 Ban Yong (班勇; born 1989), professional football player
 Ban Jiajia (班嘉佳), Bouyei actress and model

See also
 Ban (disambiguation)#People

References

Chinese-language surnames
Chu (state)
Individual Chinese surnames